Mammuthus subplanifrons, the South African Mammoth, is the oldest representative of the genus Mammuthus, appearing around 5 million years ago during the early Pliocene in what is today South Africa and countries of East Africa, especially Ethiopia. They already presented some of the unique characteristics of mammoths like the spirally, twisting tusks. In 2009, it was shown that Loxodonta adaurora is indistinguishable from Mammuthus subplanifrons. The continuously decreasing length of vertebral spines from shoulder to hip and the extreme femur to tibia ratio indicate that this species belongs to Mammuthus, not Loxodonta (Loxodonta spp. have high vertebral spines over the hips, the mid-back having the lowest), and since Mammuthus subplanifrons was named first, that would be the valid name for the species.

References

Mammoths
Cenozoic mammals of Africa
Mammuthus Subplanifrons
Fossil taxa described in 1928